J. Kurt Roehrig (born 28 October 1956) is a motorsports engineer and racing driver. Roehrig was the head of former NASCAR Cup Series team Roehrig Motorsports. Roehrig himself has raced in various series such as the IMSA GT Championship.

Racing career

Sports car racing
Kurt Roehrig started racing cars in the late 1970s alongside his brother J. Dana Roehrig. The brothers raced in the 1978 IMSA GT Championship. In a Porsche 911 the duo worked their way up to 18th place after starting 43rd in the 20th Annual Daytona Fire Cracker 400. His debut at the 24 Hours of Daytona, in 1979 ended after 223 laps. For the occasion Roehrig joined Dave White and John Hamilton at D.R. Racing.
 The following year Roehrig and White, joined by Canadian Francois Laurin failed to qualify their BMW 320i. In 1980 Roehrig also raced a Ford Capri RS 2600 entered by Clay Dopke. Together with Dopke the duo finished twelfth at Lime Rock Park. In 1981 Roehrig achieved his best result at the 24 Hours of Daytona. Roehrig joined Kent Racing along with Walt Bohren and Jim Mullen. The team finished tenth overall, fifth in the GTU class.

Roehrig made his first of many Trans-Am Series starts in 1984. At Watkins Glen International Roehrig was entered by Lou Infante Motoracing in a Buick Regal Turbo. The Michigan registered driver started 21st but finished in eighteenth place. A second race in the series saw Roehrig retire with fuel press issues.

Single seaters
To promote Roehrig Engineering Inc. Kurt entered a number of single seater races. The Michigan-based racing driver entered the inaugural Barber Saab Pro Series season in 1986. This resulted in a twelfth place in the season standings. Roehrig also attempted to enter the Atlantic Championship East division race at the Grand Prix of St. Petersburg. As his Ralt RT1 encountered engine trouble he was unable to start the race. His most recent single seater starts were in 2004. Roehrig made six race starts in the Star Mazda series. His best results was a sixteenth place at Mazda Raceway Laguna Seca.

NASCAR team owner
Roehrig started a team to enter the inaugural season of the NASCAR SuperTruck Series in 1995. Johnny Benson Jr. was the first driver for the number 18 Chevrolet C/K finishing tenth at the season opener. The team scored some impressive results but the major sponsor, Pennzoil, pulled back. Therefore the team was on the brink of bankruptcy by December 1996. The team received an impulse when Dana Corp. inked a sponsorship deal with the team. Also the team switched to Dodge engines. After a late Pennzoil sponsorship deal the team ended up entering two Dodge trucks. One truck was driven by Michael Dokken, the other by rookie Tony Raines. The team scored its first win at the Western Auto/Parts America 200 at I-70 Speedway. The following season Raines won three races for the Roehrig team. After the 1998 season Dana Corp. switched teams sponsoring Bobby Hamilton Racing.

In 1998 the team made its NASCAR Cup Series start. Raines raced for the Ford team as well as Tom Hubert and Robby Gordon. The team attempted to make their debut at the 1998 Las Vegas 400 with Raines but they failed to qualify. The following season the team only entered Hubert for one race. Hubert finished 28th at Las Vegas Motor Speedway.

For the 2000 NASCAR Winston Cup Series season Roehrig joined forces with former Olympic athlete Jackie Joyner-Kersee. The team launched Joyner-Kersee Roehrig Motorsports. The team had a troubled start. David Green was signed to race in the Daytona 500 and preliminary Bud Shootout. Green finished the Bud Shootout in twelfth place. The team did not attempt at qualifying for the Daytona 500 race. The team folded afterwards.

Personal
Kurt is the son of Second World War veteran W. Dana Roehrig (born in Topeka, Kansas) and his wife Martha C. Roehrig (born in Tulsa, Oklahoma) . Kurt's father died in 2000. Kurt's mother died in 2012. Besides J. Dana Roehrig, Kurt has another brother, Mark. Kurt graduated the General Motors Institute of Technology in 1980  in the field of Mechanical Engineering. In 1983 Roehrig joined McLaren Engines Inc. (currently a subsidiary of Linamar). Roehring formed his own company, Roehrig Engineering Inc., in 1987.

Racing results

SCCA National Championship Runoffs

American Open-Wheel racing results
(key) (Races in bold indicate pole position, races in italics indicate fastest race lap)

ECAR HFC Pro Series Atlantic Challenge

Star Mazda Championship

References

1956 births
Racing drivers from Michigan
Barber Pro Series drivers
Formula Ford drivers
SCCA National Championship Runoffs participants
Can Am drivers
Trans-Am Series drivers
IMSA GT Championship drivers
NASCAR team owners
Indy Pro 2000 Championship drivers
American automotive engineers
Living people